David Hope may refer to:

David Hope, Baron Hope of Thornes, British former archbishop
David Hope, Baron Hope of Craighead, Scottish judge and university chancellor
Dave Hope, American bassist with veteran rock act, Kansas